C. flexuosa may refer to:

Cardamine flexuosa, a species of plant in the cabbage family
Caustis flexuosa, a species of sedge
Chrysallida flexuosa, an alternative name for Parthenina flexuosa, a species of sea snail
Corydalis flexuosa, a species of flowering plant in the family Papaveraceae

See also
Flexuosa (disambiguation)